Alessandro Paci (born 21 December 1964) is an Italian actor, film director and comedian.

Biography
Tuscan comedian, debuted in the duo Duemendi, with Massimo Ceccherini. He participated in the program Aria Fresca, broadcast on Videomusic (and then on TMC2) in the mid-nineties, playing an improbable bouncer, and ironically on his physique, and he has also brought on stage a comic adaptation of the fable of Pinocchio, and Fermi tutti, questo è uno spettacolo, where he performed with his friend and colleague Massimo Ceccherini: the DVD of the show which became the theater's best-selling DVD of Italy.

Filmography

Film
Welcome to Home Gori (1990)
The Party's Over (1991)
Amami (1993)
Bonus malus (1993)
Dear Goddamned Friends (1994)
Il grande Fausto (1995)
Return to Home Gori (1996)
Albergo Roma (1996)
Stressati (1997)
Lucignolo (1999)
Picasso's Face (2000)
Andata e ritorno (2003)
Tutti all'attacco (2005)
2061: An Exceptional Year (2007)
A Beautiful Wife (2007)
Un'estate al mare (2008)
Cenci in Cina (2009)
Me and Marilyn (2009)
Amici miei – Come tutto ebbe inizio (2011)
Una vita da sogno (2011)
La mia mamma suona il rock (2012)
Sarebbe stato facile (2012)
Il professor Cenerentolo (2015)
Se son rose (2018)
Non ci resta che ridere (2019)

DVD
Cenerentolo, (2004)
Gli abiti nuovi del granduca, (2004)
La nipote di Barbablù, (2005)
La piccola fiammiferaia, (2006)
Fave (Quelli di Pinocchio), (2006)
10 Ragazze, (2011)
Oi oi oi che Crisi di Alessandro Paci e Massimo Ceccherini (2012)
Gli Arrockettati di Alessandro Paci e Massimo Ceccherini (2014)

Theatre
 Cassana (1990/1991)
 Festival dei dilettanti: aspiranti imbianchini (1986/1996)
 Fermi tutti, questo è uno spettacolo, Pinocchio (1997/1998)
 L'uomo dalla "U" alla "O" (1999/2000)
 Grande Paci (2002)
 Quei Bravi Racazzi (2007)
 Pinocchio (2008/2009)
 Ohi…Ohi…Ohi…Ohi… Che Crisi ... (2009/2010)
 Grande Paci (2011/2012)
Una Bara Per Due (2013)
Gli Arrockettati (2014/2015)
Il Peggio di Paci e Ceccherini (2014/2015)

Television

Jeans (RAI3) (1988)
La giostra (Rete4) (1989)
Star 90 (Rete4) (1990)
Radio Carolina (Italia1) (1991)
Teledanno (Canale 10) (1993/94)
AriaFresca (TMC) (1996)
Su le mani (RaiUno) (1996)
Va ora in onda (RaiUno) (1997)
Miss Italia nel mondo (RaiUno) (1997)
Colorado (RaiUno) (1998)
Cocco di mamma (RaiUno) (1998)
Miss Italia nel mondo (RaiUno) (1999)
Sognando Las Vegas (RaiUno) (2003)
Domenica in (RaiUno) (2003/04)
Incapaci d'intendere (Toscana Channel) (2004)
Il Duello (Toscana Channel) (2005)
I Fuoriclasse (RaiUno) (2007)
Stracult (RaiDue) (2009)
Voglia d'aria fresca (2010)
Stracult (RaiDue) (2011)
Ridi col Tubo (italia7) (2011) (2012)
Attenti al Tubo (Rtv38) (2014) (2015)
Gran Galà Attenti al tubo (Rtv38) (2014)
Sabato Cinema (Rtv38) (2014) (2015)
Due come noi (2015)

Radio
Manikomio 77 (Radio Rosa) (2015)

Books
"o un gli tiro" by Alessandro Paci and Massimo Ceccherini - Loggia De' Lanzi (1996)
"Ridi sul Vaso" by Alessandro Paci -  LaNuovaLito (2011)
"Frank Jabroni nemico pubblico n°9" di Alessandro Paci and "Alessio Nonfanti" - Wizard Productions  (2012)
"Frank Jabroni Public Enemy no 9" di Alessandro Paci e "Alessio Nonfanti" - editore Wizard Productions  (2015)

References

External links

Official Website

1964 births
Living people
People from Scandicci
Italian male film actors
Italian film directors
Italian male comedians